Hayward Cary Kidson (11 November 1925 – 24 April 1995) was a South African cricket umpire. He stood in eleven Test matches between 1961 and 1967.

See also
 List of Test cricket umpires

References

1925 births
1995 deaths
South African Test cricket umpires